Uronematidae is a family of ciliates in the order Philasterida.

References 

 Studies on the morphology of Uronema marinum Dujardin (Ciliatea: Uronematidae) with a description of the histopathology of the infection in marine fishes. PJ Cheung, RF Nigrelli, GD Ruggieri, Journal of Fish Diseases, 1980
 Toxic effects of heavy metals upon cultures of Uronema marinum (Ciliophora: Uronematidae). JG Parker, Marine biology, 1979

External links 
 
 
 
 Uronematidae at the World Register of Marine Species (WoRMS)

Philasterida
Ciliate families